The Horticulturist and Journal of Rural Art and Rural Taste was a monthly magazine on "horticulture, landscape gardening, rural architecture, embellishments, pomology, floriculture, and all subjects of rural life, literature, art, and taste".

A. J. Downing, the famous landscape designer, horticulturist, and journalist, founded the magazine in 1846 and edited it until his death in 1852. After Downing died there were several different editors, including Patrick Barry (1816–1890), John Jay Smith (1798–1881), and Henry T. Williams. In 1875 the Horticulturist and Journal of Rural Art and Rural Taste was merged with The Gardener's Monthly and Horticultural Advertiser and published from 1876 to 1888 under the title The Gardener's Monthly and Horticulturist. Thomas Meehan was then the editor.

See also
 List of horticultural magazines

References

Lifestyle magazines published in the United States
Monthly magazines published in the United States
Defunct magazines published in the United States
Horticultural magazines
Magazines established in 1846
Magazines disestablished in 1876
Magazines published in New York (state)
Magazines published in Philadelphia
Mass media in Albany, New York
Mass media in Rochester, New York